Not to be confused with Factor Inhibiting HIF Asparaginyl Hydroxylase Inhibitors

Hypoxia-inducible factor prolyl hydroxylase Inhibitors (HIF-PHIs) also known as hypoxia-inducible factor stabilizers (HIF stabilizers) are a novel class of drugs that act by inhibiting hypoxia-inducible factor-proline dioxygenase (HIF prolyl-hydroxylase) which is responsible for breaking down the hypoxia-inducible factor (HIF) under conditions of normal oxygen concentrations.

As of 2023, Vadadustat, Daprodustat, and Roxadustat are the most studied HIF-PHIs with highest number of phase III & Phase IV patient data for chronic kidney disease. All the three drug are available in Japan, while Vadadustat & Daprodustat is under EU regulatory review for potential approval in 2023. US FDA approved Daprodustat in early 2023 after a positive adcom for favorable benefit-risk ratio, while Vadadustat is awaiting an even-handed response to its formal dispute resolution appeal, considering recent FDA approval of Daprodustat.

Outside of chronic kidney disease, Akebia Therapeutics has reported initial findings from its phase II study evaluating Vadadustat for ARDS in Covid-19 patients. Based on the results Akebia Therapeutics has decided to move forward with a phase III study in broader ARDS patients.

The rights to Vadadustat is held by Akebia Therapeutics in partnership with CSL Vifor, Roxadustat by Fibrogen in partnership with Astellas, and Daprodustat has been internally developed by GSK.

Examples
 Daprodustat
 Desidustat
 Enarodustat
 Molidustat
 Roxadustat (marketed in China)
 Vadadustat

See also
 Hypoxia-inducible factors#As a therapeutic target

References

Enzyme inhibitors